Associazione Sportiva Roma was rejuvenated in Carlo Mazzone's second season as coach, much due to Abel Balbo being the goalscorer it had lacked for the previous years. The summer signings of 1994 helped, with internationally recognized players Jonas Thern and Daniel Fonseca joining the club from rivals Napoli. Also Francesco Moriero became a household player since he proved his worth in the club, recently coming from Cagliari.

Players

Transfers

Winter

Competitions

Overall

Last updated: 4 June 1995

Serie A

League table

Results summary

Results by round

Matches

Coppa Italia

Second round

Round of 16

Quarter-finals

Statistics

Players statistics

Goalscorers
  Abel Balbo 22 (5)
  Daniel Fonseca 8 (2)
  Massimiliano Cappioli 5
  Francesco Totti 4

References

A.S. Roma seasons
Roma